Bohdalov is a market town in Žďár nad Sázavou District in the Vysočina Region of the Czech Republic. It has about 1,200 inhabitants.

Administrative parts
The village of Chroustov is an administrative part of Bohdalov.

References

Populated places in Žďár nad Sázavou District
Market towns in the Czech Republic